Class traitor is a term used mostly in socialist discourse to refer to a member of the proletarian class who works directly or indirectly against their class interest, or against their economic benefit and in favor of the bourgeoisie. It applies particularly to soldiers, police officers, bounty hunters, loss prevention, vigilantes, security guards (mainly those hired by private security companies), workers who cross and refuse to respect picket lines during a strike and anyone paid a wage who actively facilitates the status quo. According to Barbara Ehrenreich: "Class treason is an option at all socioeconomic levels: from the blue-collar man who becomes a security guard employed to harass striking workers, to the heirs of capitalist fortunes who become donors to left-wing causes".

In Russia before and during the Russian Revolution, the Bolsheviks and other socialist revolutionary organizations used it to describe the Czarist Army and any working class citizen who opposed the dictatorship of the proletariat. The term was later extended to include the Menshevik Russians and other counter-revolutionary socialist organizations under Joseph Stalin.

The motives behind becoming a traitor to one's class can include the necessity of survival (taking up whatever wage is available), the belief that the person is of a higher class and so has political views that work against the working class, the pressure of conformity, or a rejection of the view that society is divided up into antagonistic classes.

Bourgeois class traitors 
While the idea of the class traitor is one typically applied to the proletariat, it can also be used to describe members of the upper-class who believe in and espouse socialist ideals. For example, Peter Kropotkin, an anarcho-communist who wrote The Conquest of Bread, was born into a noble family. Additionally, Friedrich Engels, partner and lifelong friend of Karl Marx, the revolutionary socialist, was himself a son of a wealthy factory owner. Such people sacrifice their ability to be part of the capitalist upper-class for the sake of who they see as the oppressed, even if it hurts their status in the process.

The Earl of Cardigan was described as a class traitor by The Daily Telegraph for denouncing police violence he had witnessed.

See also 
 Class struggle
 False consciousness
 Lumpenproletariat
 Race traitor
 Sycophant

References 

Socialism